"Just Another Night" is a song by Swedish synthpop duo Icona Pop. It was released worldwide on 28 January 2014 as a digital download. The music video was directed by Marc Klasfeld in black and white located in Paris.

Music video
The black-and-white music video for the song was directed by Marc Klasfeld and shot in Paris. The video begins with a French woman explaining how "2 Swedish girls" fell for "1 Italian man" as clips are interlaced. The plot follows the divide between the duo as they are both in love with the same man, who, in the end, leaves both of them for another woman. The video is heavily influenced by film noir and has vintage 1960s elements.

Track listing

Free download
 "Just Another Night" (Steve Porter "Full Vocal Mix") – 4:00
 "Just Another Night" (Steve Porter "Instrumental") – 4:15
 "Just Another Night" (Steve Porter "Club Dub") – 4:15

Charts

References

2014 singles
2014 songs
Icona Pop songs
Songs written by Aino Jawo
Songs written by Caroline Hjelt
Songs written by Mikkel Storleer Eriksen
Songs written by Tor Erik Hermansen
Songs written by Benny Blanco
Songs written by Justin Parker
Songs written by Robopop
Songs written by Ross Golan
Song recordings produced by Stargate (record producers)
Song recordings produced by Benny Blanco
Big Beat Records (American record label) singles
Black-and-white music videos